The Brazilian Journal of Chemical Engineering publishes papers, reporting basic and applied research and innovation in the field of chemical engineering and related areas.  It was first published by the Associação Brasileira de Engenharia Química, São Paulo, in 1983 as the Revista Brasileira de Engenharia, Caderno de Engenharia Química.  With vol. 11 (1994), it continued as the Brazilian Journal of Chemical Engineering.

It continues the Revista Brasileira de Engenharia, Caderno de Engenharia Química from 1994 on.

Fulltext of the journal is available via SciElo starting from vol. 14 (1997) to vol. 36 (2019).

From January 2020 on, the journal is published by Springer.

See also 
 Anais da ABQ
 Journal of the Brazilian Chemical Society
 Química Nova
 Revista Brasileira de Química

References

External links 
 Homepage of the journal (up to December 2019): 
 Homepage of the Associação Brasileira de Engenharia Química (ABEQ): 
 Homepage of the journal (from January 2020):

Chemical engineering journals
Academic journals published by learned and professional societies of Brazil
Publications established in 1983
Portuguese-language journals